Moulay Bousselham is a town in Kénitra Province, Rabat-Salé-Kénitra, Morocco. According to the 2004 census it has a population of 5,693.

History
In the center of local history are the (partly legendary) episodes about a man who came from Egypt in the middle of the 16th century and was killed in the battle of the three kings (August 4, 1578). He was then buried in the coastal town, which resulted in several miracles. Later, a small mausoleum (koubba) was built over his grave, which is visited by many pilgrims every summer. As a result, other "holy men" came here, whose dome tombs are scattered across the town.
 
Since the 1960s, the fishing village has developed into a seaside resort, where today many Moroccans, but also Europeans, spend a few hours or days on the beach.

References

Populated places in Kénitra Province
Rural communes of Rabat-Salé-Kénitra